Chakkrawat is a khwaeng (subdistrict) of Samphanthawong district, Bangkok.

History
In the year 1915, corresponding to the King Vajiravudh (Rama VI)'s reign. Chakkrawat was an amphoe (district) of Phra Nakhon province, same as Sam Yaek, Sampheng, and Samphanthawong.

Later in the year 1931, during the King Prajadhipok (Rama VII)'s reign. The economic downturn, the Siamese government therefore has to save the nation's budget. Therefore had to merge the Chakkrawat and Sampeng together with Samphanthawong since then.

Until the year 1973, Bangkok Metropolitan Administration (BMA) was officially established. Samphanthawong therefore changed the status to a full district and Chakkrawat officially changed its status to a subdistrict of Samphanthawong.

Its name after Wat Chakkrawat, an old temple dates back to the Ayutthaya period, or formerly known as  "Wat Sam Pluem" which located in this area.

Geography
Chakkrawat considered as the northwest part of the district. The left side of the subdistrict adjacent to the Chao Phraya river throughout the area.

Neighbouring subdistricts are (from north clockwise): Samphanthawong in its district (Yaowarat and Yaowaphanit roads are the borderlines), Somdet Chao Phraya and Khlong San of Khlong San (across Chao Phraya river), Wang Burapha Phirom of Phra Nakhon (Khlong Rop Krung is a borderline).

Chakkrawat and Yaowarat with Ratchawong roads are the main thoroughfares. For Chakkrawat is a short road with a length of only 1 km (0.62 mi) and has one-way traffic management, starting from S.A.B. intersection, ran to the southwest through Wat Tuek intersection before ending at the foot of Phra Pok Klao bridge nearby.

Demography

In the year 2017, Chakkrawat had a total of 7,529 people (3,699 men, 3,830 women) in 5,037 households.

Places
Wat Chakkrawat
Wat Bophit Phimuk
Rajamangala University of Technology Rattanakosin Bophit Phimuk Chakkrawat Campus
Song Wat Road
Chakkrawat Metropolitan Police Station
Ratchawong Pier
Talat Kao (Old Market)
Guan Yu  and Sek Tao Shrine
Soi Wanit 1 (Sampheng)
Bangkok Bank, Sampheng Branch 
Tang Toh Kang Gold Shop
Saphan Han
Peiing Public School
Wat Lokanukroh
Bangkok River Park
Khlong Thom

References

Samphanthawong district
Subdistricts of Bangkok
Populated places on the Chao Phraya River